The Prix Albert Caquot is an annual prestigious award presented by the French Association of Civil Engineering.  It is named after Albert Caquot, a famous and influential French civil engineer. The award is given for a lifetime of scientific and technical achievements, as well as high ethical standards and influence throughout the construction industry. It alternates between French and foreign nominees.

Award winners
1989 Fritz Leonhardt
1990 Pierre Xercavins
1991 Franco Levi
1992 Henri Mathieu
1993 Bruno Thürlimann
1994 Roger Lacroix, Jean-Claude Foucriat
1995 Tung-Yen Lin
1996 Jean M. Muller
1997 René Walther
1998 Jacques Bietry
1999 Jörg Schlaich
2000 Pierre Richard, Inventor of Béton de Poudre Réactive (BPR)
2001 Alan Garnett Davenport
2002 Jacques Mathivat
2003 John E. Breen 
2004 Jacques Brozzetti
2005 Jan Moksnes
2006 Michel Virlogeux
2007 José Câncio Martins
2008 Michel Lévy
2009 Jean-Marie Cremer
2010 Jean-Armand Calgaro
2011 Manfred A. Hirt
2012 Michel Placidi
2013 Jiří Stráský
2014 Jacques Combault,
2015 Armando Rito
2016 Alain Pecker

References

External links
Association Francaise de Genie Civil
Prix Caquot 2011, with list of all recipients up to 2011, Le Moniteur, April 4, 2012

Civil engineering
Albert Caquot